Kurt Zellhofer (born 9 March 1958) is an Austrian former cyclist. He competed at the 1980 Summer Olympics and the 1984 Summer Olympics.

References

External links
 

1958 births
Living people
Austrian male cyclists
Olympic cyclists of Austria
Cyclists at the 1980 Summer Olympics
Cyclists at the 1984 Summer Olympics
Cyclists from Vienna
20th-century Austrian people